Clarks Mills is an unincorporated community in Mercer County, Pennsylvania, United States. Clarks Mills has a post office, with ZIP code 16114.

References

Unincorporated communities in Mercer County, Pennsylvania
Unincorporated communities in Pennsylvania